Dale McBride (December 18, 1936 – November 30, 1992) was an American country music singer. In the 1970s, he charted several singles on the Billboard country charts, including two Top 40 hits on the Con Brio Records label. His son is Terry McBride, who fronted the 1990s country band McBride & the Ride and has written singles for Brooks & Dunn. Dale McBride died in 1992 of a brain tumor.

Biography
Dale McBride was born in Lampasas, Texas, on December 18, 1936. He began recording in the 1950s, having several local rockabilly hits in Mississippi. In the late 1960s, McBride was discovered by Dean Martin, who signed him to a contract with Reprise Records. At the time, however, the label was focused mainly on the adult contemporary radio format, and McBride did not have significant success on the label. He later moved to Thunderbird Records, where he began recording country music cover songs and original material. This label also produced his first chart single in "Corpus Christi Wind".

Between 1976 and 1979, McBride recorded for Con Brio Records, charting several singles including two Top 40 country hits. After leaving the label, he continued to record into the 1980s, with his son Terry playing in his band. Terry McBride had several chart singles in the 1990s as lead singer of the band McBride & the Ride. Dale McBride died of a brain tumor in 1992.

In 2007, GMV Nashville released a remastered version of The Dale McBride Collection, an album originally released in 1992 following McBride's death. Soon after in 2008, the label also released Takin' A Long Look.

Discography

Albums

Singles

References

1936 births
1992 deaths
American country singer-songwriters
Singer-songwriters from Texas
20th-century American singers
People from Lampasas, Texas
Country musicians from Texas
Pompeii Records artists
Thunderbird Records artists